The Brunei Super Cup is a Brunei football cup competition. It was first held in 2002, but has been played on and off since its inception. It is the curtain raiser to the Brunei football season. This competition is played between the league champion and the cup winner.

Cup Winners 
Winners so far are: 
(Previous season league winners are listed first)

2002 : DPMM FC         2–1     Wijaya FC
2003 : Wijaya FC       1–0     MS ABDB          
2004 : DPMM FC         4–3     MS ABDB 
2007 : QAF FC          2–0     AH United   
2008 : QAF FC          2–0     MS ABDB
Piala Sumbangsih
2014 :  Indera SC          1–2     MS ABDB
2015 : Indera SC          2–0     MS ABDB
2016 : MS ABDB 2–1 Indera SC
2017 : MS ABDB 2–1 Indera SC
2018 : MS ABDB 1–2 Indera SC
2019 : not held
2020 : MS ABDB 1–3 Kota Ranger

References

Football competitions in Brunei
Brunei
Recurring sporting events established in 2002
2002 establishments in Brunei